Tony van Diepen (born 17 April 1996) is a Dutch athlete competing in the 400 and 800 metres. He won a bronze medal in the 400 metres at the 2019 European Indoor Championships in a new Dutch record of 46.13.

International competitions

Personal bests
Outdoor
200 metres – 22.23 (Wageningen 2018)
400 metres – 45.83 (La Chaux-de-Fonds 2019)
600 metres – 1:16.08 (Pliezhausen 2018)
800 metres – 1:44.14 (Paris 2022)
1500 metres – 3:53.58 (Tilburg 2020)
Indoor
400 metres – 46.06 (Torun 2021)
600 metres – 1:17.73 (Ulsteinvik 2020)
800 metres – 1:46.49 (New York 2022)

References

External links

Official website

1996 births
Living people
Sportspeople from Alkmaar
Dutch male sprinters
Dutch male middle-distance runners
European Athletics Indoor Championships winners
Athletes (track and field) at the 2020 Summer Olympics
Olympic athletes of the Netherlands
Medalists at the 2020 Summer Olympics
Olympic silver medalists in athletics (track and field)
Olympic silver medalists for the Netherlands
20th-century Dutch people
21st-century Dutch people